Todd Cahoon (born September 15, 1973) is an American actor.  He starred as Jack Porter on the MyNetworkTV serial Watch Over Me.   His previous acting credits include guest appearances on CSI: NY, Without a Trace and Charmed.

Filmography
Bay State (1991) .... Davis Sands #2 (1994–1996)
Under Pressure (2000) .... Submarine First Mate
Destiny (2002) .... Brad
Bob Steel (2004) .... Young Rich Man
Ladder 49 (2004) .... Paramedic Taping Pizza Slices to Lonely Dog
Charmed (1998) .... Dominic - Episode: "Still Charmed and Kicking" (2005)
Without a Trace (2002) .... Jake - Episode: "From the Ashes" (2005)
Decoy (2006) .... Homeless Brother
Zoey 101 (2005) .... Dean Taylor - Episode: "Hot Dean" (2006)
CSI: NY (2004) .... Anthony Fabrizio - Episode: "Some Buried Bones" (2007) and Matt Cooper - Episode: "Like Water For Murder" (2008)
Nip/Tuck (2003) .... Bob Levitts - Episodes: "Magda and Jeff" and "Kyle Ainge" (2008)
The Closer (2005) .... Ryan Hughes - Episode 4x08: "Split Ends" (2008)
Cold Case (2003) .... Bruce Donnelly - Episode: "The Dealer" (2008)
Watch Over Me (2006) .... Jack Porter
The Poughkeepsie Tapes (2007) .... Ted Bundy
Desperate Housewives (2009) .... Bill Brown
 Lift Me Up (2015) .... John Donelson

External links

1973 births
American male film actors
American male television actors
Male actors from California
Living people
Male actors from San Jose, California